Iliotibial band syndrome (ITBS) is the second most common knee injury, and is caused by inflammation located on the lateral aspect of the knee due to friction between the iliotibial band and the lateral epicondyle of the femur. Pain is felt most commonly on the lateral aspect of the knee and is most intensive at 30 degrees of knee flexion. Risk factors in women include increased hip adduction and knee internal rotation. Risk factors seen in men are increased hip internal rotation and knee adduction. ITB syndrome is most associated with long-distance running, cycling, weight-lifting, and with military training.

Signs and symptoms 
ITBS symptoms range from a stinging sensation just above the knee and outside of the knee (lateral side of the knee) joint, to swelling or thickening of the tissue in the area where the band moves over the femur. The stinging sensation just above the knee joint is felt on the outside of the knee or along the entire length of the iliotibial band. Pain may not occur immediately during activity, but may intensify over time. Pain is most commonly felt when the foot strikes the ground, and pain might persist after activity. Pain may also be present above and below the knee, where the ITB attaches to the tibia.

Causes 
ITBS can result from one or more of the following: training habits, anatomical abnormalities, or muscular imbalances:

Training habits
 Spending long periods of time/regularly sitting in lotus posture in yoga. Esp beginners forcing the feet onto the top of the thighs
 Consistently running on a horizontally banked surface (such as the shoulder of a road or an indoor track) on which the downhill leg is bent slightly inward, causing extreme stretching of the band against the femur
 Inadequate warm-up or cool-down
 Excessive up-hill and down-hill running
 Positioning the feet "toed-in" to an excessive angle when cycling. (Knee should be positioned between 30 and 35 degree to help avoid ITBS)
 Running up and down stairs
 Hiking long distances
 Rowing
 Breaststroke
 Treading water

Abnormalities in leg/feet anatomy
 High or low arches
 Supination of the foot
 Excessive lower-leg rotation due to over-pronation
 Excessive foot-strike force
 Uneven leg lengths
 Bowlegs or tightness about the iliotibial band.

Muscle imbalance
 Weak hip abductor muscles
 Weak/non-firing multifidus muscle
 Uneven left-right stretching of the band, which could be caused by habits such as sitting cross-legged

Anatomical mechanism
Iliotibial band syndrome is one of the leading causes of lateral knee pain in runners. The iliotibial band is a thick band of fascia on the lateral aspect of the knee, extending from the outside of the pelvis, over the hip and knee, and inserting just below the knee. The band is crucial to stabilizing the knee during running, as it moves from behind the femur to the front of the femur during activity. The continual rubbing of the band over the lateral femoral epicondyle, combined with the repeated flexion and extension of the knee during running may cause the area to become inflamed.

Diagnosis
Diagnosis of iliotibial band syndrome is based on history and physical exam findings, including tenderness at the lateral femoral epicondyle, where the iliotibial band passes over the bone.

Treatment

Conservative treatments 
While ITBS pain can be acute, the iliotibial band can be rested, iced, compressed and elevated (RICE) to reduce pain and inflammation, followed by stretching. Utilization of corticosteroid injections and the use of anti-inflammatory medication on the painful area are possible treatments for ITB syndrome. Corticosteroid injections have been shown to decrease running pains significantly 7 days after the initial treatment. Similar results can be found with the use of anti-inflammatory medication, analgesic/anti-inflammatory medication, specifically. Other non-invasive treatments include things such as, flexibility and strength training, neuromuscular/gait training, manual therapy, training volume reduction, or changes in running shoe.  Muscular training of the gluteus maximus and hip external rotators is stressed highly as those muscles are associated with many of the risk factors of ITBS. For runners specifically, neuromuscular/gait training may be needed for success in muscular training interventions to ensure that those trained muscles are used properly in the mechanics of running. Strength training alone will not result in decrease in pain due to ITBS, however, gait training, on its own can result in running form modification that reduces the prevalence of risk factors.

Surgical treatments 
Treatments as intensive and invasive as surgery are utilized if several conservative approaches fail to produce results. 6 months should be given for conservative treatments to work before surgical intervention as used.

Epidemiology

Occupation 
Significant association between the diagnosis of ITBS and occupational background of the patients has been thoroughly determined. Occupations that require extensive use of iliotibial band are more susceptible to develop ITBS due to continuum of their iliotibial band repeatedly abrading against lateral epicondyle prominence, thereby inducing inflammatory response. Professional or amateur runners are at high clinical risk of ITBS in which shows particularly greater risk in long-distance. Study suggests ITBS alone makes up 12% of all running-related injuries and 1.6% to 12% of runners are affected by ITBS.

The relationship between ITBS and mortality/morbidity is claimed to be absent. A study showed that coordination variability did not vary significantly between runners with no injury and runners with ITBS. This result elucidates that the runner's ability to coordinate themselves toward direction of their intention (motor coordination) is not, or very minorly affected by the pain of ITBS.

Additionally, military trainee in marine boot camps displayed high incidence rate of ITBS. Varying incidence rate of 5.3–22% in basic training was reported in a case study. A report from the U.S. Marine Corps announces that running/overuse-related injuries accounted for >12% of all injuries.

In contrast, studies suggested antithesis of conventional perception that racial, gender or age difference manifests in different incidence rate of ITBS diagnosis. No meaningful statistical data successfully provides significant correlation between ITBS and gender, age, or race. Although, there had been a claim that females are more prone to ITBS due to their anatomical difference in pelvis and lower extremity. Males with larger lateral epicondyle prominence may also be more susceptible to ITBS.  Higher incidence rate of ITBS has been reported at age of 15–50, in which generally includes most of active athletes.

Other professions that had noticeable association with ITBS include cyclists, heavy weightlifters, et cetera. One observational study discovered 24% of 254 cyclists were diagnosed with ITBS within 6 years. Another study provided data that shows more than half (50%) of professional cyclists complain of knee pain.

See also 

 Chondromalacia patellae
 Patellofemoral pain syndrome
 Plica syndrome

References

Further reading

External links 

Overuse injuries
Soft tissue disorders
Syndromes